The Sochy massacre occurred on 1 June 1943 in the village of Sochy, Lublin Voivodeship in Zamość County, Lublin Voivodeship during the German occupation of Poland when approximately 181–200 of its inhabitants, including women and children, were massacred by the German Ordnungspolizei and SS in retaliation for the village’s support for the Polish resistance movement.

Background 

During World War II and the occupation of Poland by Nazi Germany (1939-1945), Poles were subjected to terror and mass German repression, both in cities and in the villages. Hundreds of Polish villages were forcibly pacified, had their inhabitants massacred, or were completely destroyed by the German occupiers.

An incomplete list drawn up after World War II estimates that 299 such Polish villages were destroyed by German forces, including Rajsk, April 16, 1942 (142 murdered); Krasowo-Częstki, 17 July 1943 (259 murdered); Skłoby, 11 April 1940 (215 murdered); Michniów, 13 July 1943 (203 murdered); Józefów, April 14, 1940 (169 murdered); Kitów, December 11, 1942 (174 murdered); Sumin, 29 January 1943 (118 murdered); Sochy, 1 June 1943 (181 murdered); Borów, 2 February 1944 (232 murdered); Łążek, February 2, 1944 (187 murdered); Szczecyn, 2 February 1944 (368); Jamy, Lublin Voivodeship, March 3, 1944 (147 murdered); Milejów, 6 September 1939 (150 murdered); Kaszyce, 7 March 1943 (117 murdered); Krusze, 31 August 1944 (158 murdered); Lipniak-Majorat, September 2, 1944 (370 murdered) and many others.

The largest pacification operation took place between November 1942 and August 1943 in the region of Zamość in Poland, which was selected by the Germans for German colonization as part of the Generalplan Ost plan. More than 110,000 Polish peasants, 31 percent of the Zamość population, were expelled from 300 villages; Some were taken to Germany as slave labor while many others were sent to the Auschwitz or Majdanek concentration camps where they were murdered. A number of Polish children were taken away from their families and deported with the intention of being Germanized. Those who were not killed or deported were driven from their homes by the German General Government. The occupants' next plans were to depopulate another 400 Polish villages.

Pacification and expulsion of Poles in the Lublin region was under the control of the SS commander and police chief in the Lublin District, SS-Brigadeführer Odilo Globocnik. The first deportations took place on the night of November 27–28, 1942. By the end of December, 60 villages inhabited by about 34,000 Poles were depopulated. The second phase of the operation lasted from mid-January to the end of March 1943 and covered mainly the areas of the Hrubieszów poviat. 63 villages had been displaced by then.

The Germans’ actions was met with passive resistance from the displaced population and by armed reactions from the Polish resistance movement. Guerrilla units of the Peasant Battalions, the Home Army and the People's Guard attempted to stop the Germans’ pacification and displacement efforts by attacking German economic and communication facilities, as well as through attacks against the Germans themselves and their colonists occupying the pacified Polish villages. The resistance posed by the Polish guerrillas, as well as the difficult situation of German troops on the Eastern Front, forced the occupiers to temporarily halt their depopulation efforts. They resumed in the last days of June 1943. Before that, the Germans carried out a series of violent pacification operations in the Zamość region. One of the victims of these actions was the village of Sochy in the commune of Zwierzyniec.

Probably the reason for the pacification was the cooperation of the inhabitants of Sochy with the Polish resistance. According to witnesses, shortly before the massacre, Gestapo agents appeared in the village, claiming to be partisans, examining the attitude of the population to the Polish resistance. Extermination in Sochy was one of the many pacifications that the Germans carried out in the Zamość region and in Poland.

Massacre 

Early in the morning of June 1, 1943, German troops arrived in Sochy. The pacification expedition included mainly German Ordnungspolizei officers stationed in Zamość. They were also accompanied by SS members and Ukrainian or Russian-speaking collaborators. The village of Sochy is located in a valley. The Germans were on the slopes of this valley and then surrounded the village with a tight cordon. When the inhabitants saw the Germans, they began to take their belongings out of their homes because they expected that displacement action would start soon.

But the Germans entered the village and began a systematic massacre. Women, children, men and old people were murdered. The buildings were set on fire together with the wounded left inside. There were also cases of Germans throwing victims into burning buildings. Whole families were killed during the pacification.

Around 8:00 am, the German police withdrew from Sochy. Then, 7 to 10 Luftwaffe aircraft bombed and fired machine guns at both the village and nearby fields, where the survivors of the first phase of the massacre were hiding. A dozen or so other people were killed. It was the first case in occupied Poland of the use of military aviation by the German occupiers during the pacification of villages.

During the pacification, the German Luftwaffe also bombarded the Polish villages of Momoty Dolne, Momoty Górne, Pawłów, Chełm County, Tokary, Lublin Voivodeship, and Klew.

The number of victims of the massacre is estimated at 181, 182, 183 or about 200 people. Nearly half of the village inhabitants were killed. Some people were outside the village. According to Czesław Madajczyk, 106 men, 53 women and 24 children were among the victims, other sources say that 108 men and 54 women or 103 women and children were murdered. The Register of places and facts of crimes committed by the Nazi occupier in Poland in the years 1939–1945 contains the names of 159 identified victims of pacification. The rest were buried unidentified. The village was almost completely burned; only three residential houses and two barns survived.

Epilogue
The Germans ordered the municipal authorities to organize a burial of victims. Among the ruins and piles of corpses, the inhabitants of the surrounding towns found about 25 seriously wounded. They were taken to the hospital in Biłgoraj. The murdered inhabitants of Sochy were buried in seven mass graves.

The massacre echoed widely. Reports about the Polish underground and underground press informed about it. In retaliation for the massacre and pacification of Sochy, partisan units of the Polish Underground State of the Home Army commanded by Adam Piotrowski, pseud. "Dolina", Jan Turowski pseud. "Norbert" and Tadeusz Kuncewicz pseud. "Podkowa" attacked the village of Siedliska occupied by German colonists (5/6 June 1943). According to underground sources, 60 people were killed and 140 farms burned.

Memorial 

In the village of Sochy there is a cemetery with mass graves of victims of the massacre carried out by the German Nazi occupiers. A gate with an inscription - one of the commandments from the Decalogue "5. Thou shalt not kill" ("Nie zabijaj") leads to the cemetery. A monument was also built to commemorate the victims, among whom there were about 45 children, 52 women and 88 men who were murdered.
There is also a board near the cemetery informing about the pacification and extermination of the inhabitants of the village of Sochy by German invaders, in three languages: Polish, German and English.

In culture 
The work of the poet Teresa Ferenc, who, as a nine-year-old child, survived the pacification of Sochy and lost both her parents in it, refers to the massacre in Sochy and World War II.

The family trauma associated with the pacification of Sochy is the main theme of the book "A Small Annihilation" (Mała Zagłada) (2015 edition), whose author is the daughter of Teresa Ferenc, Anna Janko.

Based on the book by Anna Janko, a documentary film entitled "A Small Annihilation" (Mała Zagłada) was created

Gallery

See also

Ethnic cleansing of Zamojszczyzna by Nazi Germany
Nazi crimes against the Polish nation
Zamość uprising
Katyn massacre
Lidice
Marzabotto massacre
Oradour-sur-Glane massacre
Sant'Anna di Stazzema massacre
Distomo massacre
Ochota massacre
Wola massacre

References 

Bibliography
 Davies, Norman (2008). Boże igrzysko. Historia Polski [God's Playground. A History of Poland] (in Polish). Krakow: Znak. .
 Lukas, Richard C. (2018). Dziecięcy płacz. Holokaust dzieci żydowskich i polskich w latach 1939-1945 [Did the Children Cry: Hitler's War Against Jewish and Polish Children, 1939–1945,] (in Polish). Poznań: Replika. .
  Lukas, Richard C. (2012). Zapomniany Holokaust. Polacy pod okupacją niemiecką 1939-1945 [The Forgotten Holocaust. The Poles Under German Occupation, 1939-1944] (in Polish). Poznań: Dom Wydawniczy Rebis. .
  Fajkowski, Józef; Religa, Jan (1981). Zbrodnie hitlerowskie na wsi polskiej 1939–1945 [Nazi crimes in Polish villages 1939–1945] (in Polish). Warsaw: Książka i Wiedza.
 Jaczyńska, Agnieszka (2012). Sonderlaboratorium SS. Zamojszczyzna: „pierwszy obszar osiedleńczy” w Generalnym Gubernatorstwie [SS Sonderlaboratorium Zamość: "the first settlement area" in the General Government.] (in Polish). Lublin: Instytut Pamięci Narodowej – Komisja Ścigania Zbrodni przeciwko Narodowi Polskiemu. Oddział w Lublinie. .
  Jankowski, Andrzej (2009). "Wieś polska na ziemiach okupowanych przez Niemcy w czasie II wojny światowej w postępowaniach karnych organów wymiaru sprawiedliwości RFN" [A Polish village in the lands occupied by Germany during World War II in criminal proceedings of the judicial authorities of Germany]. Glaukopis 13–14 (in Polish). .
 Madajczyk, Czesław (1965). Hitlerowski terror na wsi polskiej 1939–1945. Zestawienie większych akcji represyjnych [Nazi terror in Polish villages 1939–1945. List of major repressive actions] (in Polish). Warsaw: Państwowe Wydawnictwo Naukowe.
  Madajczyk, Czesław (1979). Zamojszczyzna – Sonderlaboratorium SS. Zbiór dokumentów polskich i niemieckich z okresu okupacji hitlerowskiej. T. I i II [Zamość - Sonderlaboratorium SS. A collection of Polish and German documents from the period of the Nazi occupation. T. I and II.] (in Polish). Warsaw: Ludowa Spółdzielnia Wydawnicza.
 Mikoda, Janina (1994). Rejestr miejsc i faktów zbrodni popełnionych przez okupanta hitlerowskiego na ziemiach polskich w latach 1939–1945. Województwo zamojskie [Register of places and facts of the crimes committed by the Nazi occupier in Poland in 1939–1945. Zamość voivodship] (in Polish). Warsaw: GKBZpNP-IPN. .
 Pawlik-Kopek, Aleksandra. "Dom jako figura artystyczna w poezji Teresy Ferenc. Wstęp do problematyki" [The house as an artistic figure in the poetry of Teresa Ferenc. Introduction to the issues]. Colloquia Litteraria UKSW 2/2015 (in Polish).

External links

  Mała Zagłada film about Sochy massacre "A Small Annihilation" (Mała Zagłada)
  film about Sochy massacre
  "Children looked at the death of their parents". Family trauma exposed years later
  "Life ended and the village ceased to exist." Anna Janko on the pacification of the Zamość region and the trauma of the second generation
  69th anniversary of the pacification of Sochy
 katolicki.walbrzych.pl : 
  Zwierzyniec Commune: They remember about those killed in Sochy
  Johnny didn't forgive

Anti-Polish sentiment in Europe
1943 crimes in Poland
Massacres in 1943
Collective punishment
Crimes against children
Ethnic cleansing in Europe
June 1943 events
Massacres committed by Nazi Germany
Massacres of Poles
Massacres in Poland
Murdered Polish children
Nazi war crimes in Poland